Briefcase Full of Blues is the debut album by The Blues Brothers, released on November 28, 1978, by Atlantic Records. It was recorded live on September 9, 1978, at the Universal Amphitheatre in Los Angeles, when the band opened for comedian Steve Martin. The album consists of covers of blues and soul songs from the 1950s to 1970s.

The album reached number one on the Billboard 200 and went double platinum; according to Blues Brothers member Dan Aykroyd, the album has sold 3.5 million copies in all. It is among the highest-selling blues albums of all time.

Three singles were released from the album: "Rubber Biscuit", which reached number 37 on the Billboard Hot 100, "Soul Man", which reached number 14, and "Hey Bartender", which did not chart.

The album is dedicated to Curtis Salgado, the inspiration behind John Belushi's creation of the Blues Brothers characters.

Track listing

Personnel
 "Joliet" Jake Blues (John Belushi) – lead vocals
 Elwood Blues (Dan Aykroyd) – backing vocals, harmonica, lead vocals on "Rubber Biscuit"
Paul "The Shiv" Shaffer – Hammond organ, Wurlitzer electric piano, acoustic piano, backing vocals, musical director
Steve "The Colonel" Cropper – guitar
Matt "Guitar" Murphy – guitar
Donald "Duck" Dunn – bass guitar
Steve "Getdwa" Jordan – drums, backing vocals
Lou "Blue Lou" Marini – tenor and alto saxophones, backing vocals
Alan "Mr. Fabulous" Rubin – trumpet, backing vocals
Tom "Triple Scale" Scott – tenor and alto saxophones, backing vocals
Tom "Bones" Malone – tenor and baritone saxophones, trombone, trumpet, backing vocals

Charts

Singles

Certifications

References

External links
 Album Information on Blues Brothers Central (archive)
 Biography of the Blues Brothers from the album Briefcase Full of Blues

The Blues Brothers albums
1978 debut albums
1978 live albums
Atlantic Records live albums
Albums produced by Bob Tischler
Covers albums
Live blues albums